Gemini Sound Products Corporation is a manufacturer of professional audio and mobile DJ equipment, including DJ CD players, DJ turntables, DJ mixers, professional amplifiers, loudspeakers, wireless microphones & DJ audio effects.  Founded in 1974, the company is based in New Jersey, USA.

In June 2006, it announced the corporate name would change to GCI Technologies, an acronym meaning Gemini, Cortex, and iKey, its three divisions. Cortex, an offshoot of the Gemini brand which was working exclusively on mass-storage based controllers with embedded systems, made its debut in 2006. The Gemini DJ brand name is the most used brand of GCI Technologies.

See also
 List of phonograph manufacturers

References

External links
GCI Technologies
Gemini DJ
Cortex
GCI press release

Audio equipment manufacturers of the United States
Electronics companies established in 1974
Phonograph manufacturers
DJ equipment
1974 establishments in New Jersey